Ian Michael Peacock  (14 September 1929 – 6 December 2019) was a British television executive, who from 1963 until the spring of 1965 was the first Controller of BBC2, the Corporation's second television channel.

Early life and career 
Michael Peacock was born in Christchurch, Hampshire, on 14 September 1929. After graduating with an upper second class degree in sociology from the London School of Economics in 1952, he immediately joined BBC Television as a trainee producer, working under Grace Wyndham Goldie in the Television Talks Department, based at Alexandra Palace, which moved to the Lime Grove Studios the following year.

Career 
Peacock became the producer of Panorama, the Corporation's first weekly TV current affairs series, in 1955, at the age of twenty-six. Under his editorship, with Richard Dimbleby as anchorman, the programme developed a high reputation, and during the Suez crisis in 1956 audiences reached 12 million viewers. Peacock was responsible for the April Fools' Day hoax which fooled many viewers into believing that spaghetti grew on trees.

He was appointed Assistant Head of Television Outside Broadcasts in 1958. The following year he returned to Panorama, where ratings had fallen badly. He recruited a new team of reporters including Robert Kee and James Mossman, and restored ratings to the 8–10 million level. Peacock and Donald Baverstock, with Ian Atkins, were given the daunting task in 1959 of preparing a report into ways to improve BBC Television News. Their recommendations were accepted in full, and in 1960 he was promoted to Editor of Television News, then based at Alexandra Palace. He remained in this post until 1963, when he was appointed Chief of Programmes  (BBC2). His task was to lead the launch of the BBC's second channel, which was due to begin transmissions in 625-line UHF in April 1964.

During the first year of BBC2 he oversaw the screening of some significant successes, such as Match of the Day, sitcom The Likely Lads, and 26-part documentary series The Great War, but audiences for the new channel were very small. In 1965, he was moved across to be Controller of the more mainstream BBC1, to which it was felt his talents would be more suited. Peacock is one of only three people (the others being Alan Yentob and Michael Jackson) to have been Controller of both channels.

Under Peacock, BBC1 reached the peak of one of its most successful eras. However, his time in the post was barely longer than his tenure at BBC2. This was because in 1967 he was head-hunted to be the first Managing Director of London Weekend Television, which began transmissions in 1968. However, his time at LWT was frustrated by union problems, conflict with the other ITV contractors who objected to the new company's 'high brow' London-centric programming and ratings which were lower than anticipated. He was fired by the company in 1969 and ten senior programme staff resigned in support, including several who had left the BBC with him.

In 1971 Peacock joined Warner Bros TV Ltd as MD in London, making co-productions with BBC TV and ITV. Perhaps his most successful was David Attenborough's Life on Earth. He was a founding partner in Video Arts with Antony Jay, John Cleese and Peter Robinson which they formed to make training films for the world market. By the early 1980s Video Arts was the largest producer of training films in the world, with more than a hundred films in its catalogue. Peacock was invited to become Executive Vice President of Warner Bros TV Inc. in 1974, which meant moving with his family for two years to work in Burbank, California.

On his return to the UK he developed the TV side of Video Arts. He was chief executive of Video Arts TV, and when Milton Friedman chose VATV to produce his Free to Choose series Peacock was the executive producer, with Michael Latham his line producer.

He helped to found Manchester's Piccadilly Radio in 1974, and was a director until 1987. He was chairman of Unique Broadcasting Co. from 1989, and of UBC Media Group plc until 1995.

References

External links
 

1929 births
2019 deaths
Alumni of the London School of Economics
BBC executives
BBC One controllers
BBC Two controllers
Honorary Fellows of the London School of Economics
Officers of the Order of the British Empire